This lists youth organisations in Singapore:

Community
NYAA Gold Award Holders' Alumni 
nEbO 
Junior Chamber of Singapore 
National Youth Council of Singapore, The 
*SCAPE Co. Ltd, 
People's Association Youth Movement 
People's Association T-Net Club, The 
Generation ACTS Club, The 
Legion of Mary, The
Metropolitan YMCA,

Nature
Students Against Violation of the Earth (SAVE) 
Youth Environmental Network

Health and Wellness
Youth Advolution for Health (YAH) 
SHY - Sexual Health and Wellness for Youths

Outdoors
People's Association Adventure Pursuits 
Raleigh Society 
Singapore Adventurers' Club 
Singapore Youth Flying Club 
Sunny Island Tree Climbers

Uniformed groups
National Cadet Corps 
National Civil Defence Cadet Corps 
National Police Cadet Corps 
Red Cross Youth, Singapore Red Cross 
Saint John Ambulance Brigade, Singapore 
Girl Guides Singapore 
The Boys' Brigade in Singapore 
The Girls' Brigade Singapore 
The Singapore Scout Association

Volunteer organisations
AIESEC Singapore 
Heartware Network 
SGRainbow 
Young Out Here

Musical Groups
Singapore National Youth Orchestra 
Singapore Youth Wind Symphony 
Singapore Symphony Youth Choir [32]
Singapore Symphony Children's Choir [33]

See also
 List of social service agencies in Singapore

External links
MOE CCAB - Uniformed Group

 
 
Youth organisations